Jon Riggs (born 14 November 1962) is a former Australian rules footballer who played for St Kilda in the Victorian Football League.

Drafted in 1983 from the Burnie Tigers in Tasmania, Riggs was better known as a professional sprinter. He won the Hobart Gift in 1983 and the Esanda burnie Gift ($15000) in 1989. Also played football for West Perth in the WAFL in 1989 and 1990 as well as the Devonport Blues in the TFL in 1991.

References

1962 births
Australian rules footballers from Tasmania
St Kilda Football Club players
West Perth Football Club players
Burnie Football Club players
Devonport Football Club players
Living people